Major-General Sir Henry Hallam Parr  (24 July 1847 – 4 April 1914) was a British Army officer who became General Officer Commanding North-Western District.

Military career
Educated at Twyford School, Hallam Parr was commissioned as an ensign in the 13th Regiment of Foot on 8 September 1865. He fought in the Anglo-Zulu War in 1879, in the First Boer War in 1881 and in the Anglo-Egyptian War in 1882. He also saw action at the Battle of Tamai in March 1884 and took part in the Nile Expedition later that year during the Mahdist War. He served as adjutant-general to Lord Grenfell, in his capacity as Sirdar of the Egyptian Army, in the late 1880s. He became Commander, Shorncliffe Garrison, in July 1898, General Officer Commanding South-Eastern District in October 1899 and General Officer Commanding North-Western District in May 1902; he retired in November 1903.

Works

References

|-

1847 births
1914 deaths
British Army generals
Knights Commander of the Order of the Bath
Companions of the Order of St Michael and St George
Somerset Light Infantry officers
British Army personnel of the Anglo-Zulu War
British military personnel of the First Boer War
British Army personnel of the Anglo-Egyptian War
British Army personnel of the Mahdist War